Lirim Kastrati may refer to:

Lirim Kastrati (footballer, born January 1999), also known as Lirim M. Kastrati, football player
Lirim Kastrati (footballer, born February 1999), also known as Lirim R. Kastrati, football player